Frank J. Lynch (November 6, 1922 – January 25, 1987) was a lawyer, judge, and legislator from Pennsylvania.

He was a Delaware County, Pennsylvania County Councilman. He was a Republican member of the Pennsylvania House of Representatives from 1969 to 1980. He was appointed Judge of the Delaware Court of Common Pleas in 1985.

References

1922 births
1987 deaths
20th-century American judges
20th-century American lawyers
20th-century American politicians
Judges of the Pennsylvania Courts of Common Pleas
Republican Party members of the Pennsylvania House of Representatives
Pennsylvania city council members
Pennsylvania lawyers
Politicians from Philadelphia